Passion Killers is a British television comedy drama film, written by Charles Peattie and Mark Warren, that first broadcast on ITV on 3 April 1999. The film follows the work of a detective agency whose clients hire them to expose their cheating husbands and wives. The film stars Ben Miller and Georgia Mackenzie as partners Nick and Kim, who after running the agency together, find themselves engaging in an unexpected romance.

The film was directed by David Evans, with Andy Harries acting an executive producer alongside Christine Langan. Helen Grace, Nicholas Sidi, Michael Simkins and Sidney Livingstone co-starred in the film alongside Miller and McKenzie. Although exact viewing figures are unconfirmed, the film drew less than 6.04 million, registering outside the Top 30 most watched programmes that week. The film was released on VHS on 27 March 2000, alongside a fellow Miller-fronted ITV drama, The Blind Date. This remains the only home video release to date.

Plot
Kim (Georgia Mackenzie) decides to set up a detective agency to help people whose spouses are cheating on them after her own husband leaves her. She decides she requires the help of a man for the cases where it's the women who are two-timing and finds a partner in the form of Nick (Ben Miller), who is hardly a Romeo himself. The duo work well together – so well that it seems romance might be about to rear its head when least expected.

Cast
 Ben Miller as Nick
 Georgia Mackenzie as Kim
 Helen Grace as Maggie
 Nicholas Sidi as George
 Michael Simkins as Bill
 Sidney Livingstone as Fred
 James Weber Brown as Joe
 Dido Miles as Michelle
 Clare Bullus as Jasmine
 Emma Amos as Dawn
 Peter McNamara as Riley
 Paul Venables as Ralph

References

External links

1999 films
1999 television films
1999 comedy-drama films
British television films
ITV television dramas
Television series by ITV Studios
Television shows produced by Granada Television
Films shot in London
1990s English-language films